Croatian state right is a legal concept referring to the body of written and customary rules on the establishment and functioning of public authorities in Croatia. It also refers to the legal status of Croatia as a polity wihtin the Kingdom of Hungary in the period after the Pacta conventa was drawn up in 1102 and the 1527 election in Cetin, as well as subsequently within the Habsburg Monarchy, the Austrian Empire and Austria-Hungary arising from the existence of the rules on the establishment and functioning of public authorities in Croatia. Application of the Croatian state right in practice is pointed out as the evidence of unbroken statehood of Croatia since the Middle Ages, extending from the medieval Kingdom of Croatia.

The concept of the Croatian state right was proposed and promoted in the 19th century in the process of Croatian national revival as a means of resistance against magyarisation. The origin of the 19-century application of the concept is found in the constitution based on town privileges proposed by Josip Kušević in 1830. The Croatian state right was also referenced by Count Janko Drašković in the 1832 Dissertation. The modern Constitution of Croatia also references the Croatian state right in its preamble.

References

Law of Croatia
Legal concepts